Andrei Popescu (born 20 February 1985) is a Romanian professional football, who plays as a goalkeeper for CS Grevenmacher.

External links
 
 
 
 

1985 births
People from Horezu
Living people
Romanian footballers
Association football goalkeepers
Liga I players
Liga II players
Regionalliga players
FC Olimpia Satu Mare players
FC Sportul Studențesc București players
FC Bihor Oradea players
SCM Râmnicu Vâlcea players
SVN Zweibrücken players
SV Eintracht Trier 05 players
FSV Salmrohr players
CS Grevenmacher players
Romanian expatriate footballers
Romanian expatriate sportspeople in Germany
Expatriate footballers in Germany
Expatriate footballers in Luxembourg